Arthur Richter (1 September 1908 – 16 August 1936) was an Australian cricketer. He played in one first-class match for South Australia in 1935/36.

Originally from Port Pirie, Richter died at age 27 from a kidney illness.

See also
 List of South Australian representative cricketers

References

External links
 

1908 births
1936 deaths
Australian cricketers
South Australia cricketers
Cricketers from South Australia
People from Port Pirie